Hybrid may refer to:

Science
 Hybrid (biology), an offspring resulting from cross-breeding
 Hybrid grape, grape varieties produced by cross-breeding two Vitis species
 Hybridity, the property of a hybrid plant which is a union of two different genetic parent strains
 Hybrid (particle physics), a valence quark-antiquark pair and one or more gluons
 Hybrid solar eclipse, a rare solar eclipse type

Technology

Transportation
 Hybrid vehicle, a vehicle using more than one power source or an engine sourced from a different chassis
 Hybrid electric vehicle, a vehicle using both internal combustion and electric power sources
 Plug-in hybrid, whose battery can be recharged by a charging cable
 Hybrid bicycle, a bicycle with features of road and mountain bikes
 Hybrid train, a locomotive, railcar, or train that uses an onboard rechargeable energy storage system
 Hybrid motorcycle, a motorcycle built using components from more than one original-manufacturer products, such as Norvin, TriBSA, or Triton
 Hybrid rocket, a rocket motor using propellants from two different states of matter
 Hybrid shipping container, a container using phase change material in combination with the ability to recharge itself

Electricity and electronics
 Hybrid generator, an electric power system comprising two or more generators that supply power to a single output
 Hybrid power, the combination of a power producer and the means to store that power in an energy storage medium
 Hybrid power source, a stand-alone power system that operates independently of a larger power grid network
 Hybrid coil, a type of electrical transformer
 Hybrid coupler, a passive device used in radio and telecommunications
 Hybrid integrated circuit, a miniaturized electronic circuit combining different semiconductor devices and passive components on a substrate
 Hybrid mass spectrometer, a combination of m/z separation devices of different types
 Telephone hybrid, a type of telephone circuit
 Three-way hybrid, a device to converge content delivered via three different video transport networks

Computing
 Hybrid laptop or hybrid tablet, a cross between a tablet computer and a laptop, running mobile operating system
 Hybrid computer, a computer combining analog and digital features
 Hybrid graphics, discrete and integrated graphics processing units
 Hybrid drive, a device that combines a solid-state drive with hard disk drive

Materials
 Hybrid material, a composite of two constituents at the nanometer or molecular level
 Hybrid gemstone, a stone combining natural material with artificial material
 Hybrid paper-polymer banknote, a mixture of paper and polymer substance to make a secure banknote

Arts, entertainment and media

Fictional entities
 Hybrid (DC Comics), a fictional group of super villains
 Hybrid (Jimmy Marks), a fictional super villain in the Marvel Comics universe
 Hybrid (mythology), a creature combining body parts of two or more species
 Hybrid (Underworld), the resulting offspring when cross-mating Immortals, Vampires and Lycans
 Hybrid (Scott Washington), a fictional anti-hero in the Marvel Comics universe

Films
 Hybrid (1997 film), a 1997 horror by Fred Olen Ray
 Hybrid, a 2000 documentary in the List of POV episodes
 Hybrid (2007 film), a 2007 Syfy television film, 10th in the Maneater series
 Hybrids (2015 film), a comedy starring Paul Sorvino
 Hybrids (2017 film), an animated short
 The Hybrid (film), a 2014 science-fiction film directed by Billy O'Brien

Games
 Hybrid (video game), a 2012 video game by 5th Cell for Xbox Live Arcade
 Tekken Hybrid, a 2011 PlayStation 3 game based on the movie Tekken: Blood Vengeance

Music
 Hybrid (British band), an electronic music group
 Hybrid (Spanish band), an extreme metal band
 Hybrid (Michael Brook album), a 1985 album by Michael Brook featuring the infinite guitar, or the title track
 Hybrid (Gary Numan album), a 2002 album consisting of songs by Gary Numan remixed by other artists, or the title track
 Hybrid Theory, the debut album of Linkin Park, who was once known by the same name
 Hybrids (album), a 1999 remix album by The Creatures
 Hybrid Black, the 2019 12th studio album by Balzac
 Hybrid (Collie Buddz album), a 2019 reggae, hip-hop album by Collie Buddz
 "Hybrid", a song by Lil Yachty from his 2021 mixtape Michigan Boy Boat
 Hybrid Recordings, a record label that is a division of Metropolitan Talent

Other arts, entertainment and media
 Hybrid genre, a blend of different categories of art or culture
 Hybrids (novel), a book in the Neanderthal Parallax trilogy by Robert J. Sawyer

Sports
 Hybrid (golf), a golf club that has the characteristics between a wood and an iron
 Hybrid martial arts, fighting systems that incorporate techniques and theories from several martial arts

Other uses

 Blended learning, also known as hybrid learning, an educational model where some students attend class in-person, while others join the class virtually from home
 Hybrid beasts in folklore, mythological or folkloric creatures that combination of different animals

 Hybrid Graphics, often "Hybrid", a former graphics software company in Helsinki, Finland
 Hybrid library, a library containing a mix of print and electronic resources
 Hybrid mail, mail delivered using a combination of electronic and physical methods
 Hybrid market, a system allowing stock trades to be completed either electronically or manually
 Hybrid organization, an organization that mixes elements of various sectors of society
 Hybrid (people), used to describe people of mixed ancestry in colonial empires, now considered offensive
 Hybrid security, a type of economic instrument
 Hybrid warfare, a military strategy
 Hybrid word, a word derived from more than one language

See also
 2-in-1 PC
 Hybrid language (disambiguation)
 Hybrid tea (disambiguation)
 Hybridisation (disambiguation)
 The Hybrid (disambiguation)